Terence "Terry" George Spinks MBE (28 February 1938 – 26 April 2012) was a boxer from Great Britain, who won the gold medal in the flyweight division (– 51 kg) at the 1956 Summer Olympics in Melbourne, Australia. In the final he defeated Mircea Dobrescu of Romania on points. He was also British featherweight champion from 1960 to 1961.

Amateur career
Spinks had 200 amateur fights, and was the 1956 ABA flyweight champion.

1956 Olympic results
Round of 32: Defeated Samuel Harris (Pakistan) on points
Round of 16: Defeated Abel Laudonio (Argentina) on points
Quarterfinal: Defeated Vladimir Stolnikov (Soviet Union) on points
Semifinal: Defeated René Libeer (France) on points
Final: Defeated Mircea Dobrescu (Romania) on points (won gold medal)

Pro career
Spinks had 49 professional bouts of which he won 41.

He had his first professional bout in April 1957, against Jim Loughrey, at Harringay Arena, winning on a stoppage for a cut eye.
 	
In September 1960, Spinks fought for the British featherweight title, against the holder Bobby Neill. The fight was at the Royal Albert Hall, and Spinks won the title when the fight was stopped in the seventh due to cuts suffered by Neil.
In November 1960, the two men had a re-match at the Empire Pool, Wembley. Spinks retained his new title by knocking Neill down three times in the fourteenth, with him finally being counted out.
In May 1961, Spinks defended his title for the second time, against the Welshman, Howard Winstone. The fight was at the Empire Pool, and Winstone won by a technical knockout in the tenth round.

After losing his title, Spinks continued fighting, but never challenged for a title again. He had his last fight in December 1962 against Johnny Mantle, winning by a technical knockout in the eighth.
After his boxing career ended Spinks became a trainer, coaching the South Korean team at the 1972 Olympics in Munich. He witnessed the Black September terrorists approaching the Israeli quarters before the Munich massacre and raised the alarm.

After boxing

After his boxing career ended, Spinks life took a turn for the worse. He became seriously ill, became a heavy drinker and, in his own words, was living "like a tramp". He was taken in by his cousin in Chadwell Heath where he lived for 19 years until his death.

Honours
He was awarded the MBE in the 2002 New Years Honours List.

Death
Spinks died at his home in Essex on 26 April 2012, after a long illness. More than 200 ex-boxers, including Bobby Neill and several more of Terry's former opponents, attended his funeral at East London Cemetery. Author and sports historian Norman Giller, his long-time friend, said in the eulogy: "Terry hung up his gloves in 1962 but we have never hung up our memories of one of the most accomplished fighters to come out of the East End boxing factory."

See also
 List of British featherweight boxing champions

References

External links
 databaseOlympics

1938 births
2012 deaths
Featherweight boxers
Flyweight boxers
Boxers at the 1956 Summer Olympics
Olympic boxers of Great Britain
English Olympic medallists
Olympic gold medallists for Great Britain
Members of the Order of the British Empire
Olympic medalists in boxing
British boxing trainers
English male boxers
Medalists at the 1956 Summer Olympics
People from the London Borough of Newham